Tanja Schneider (born 19 February 1974 in Lienz) is an Austrian former alpine skier who competed in the 2002 Winter Olympics.

References 
 

1974 births
Living people
Austrian female alpine skiers
Olympic alpine skiers of Austria
Alpine skiers at the 2002 Winter Olympics
People from Lienz
Sportspeople from Tyrol (state)
20th-century Austrian women
21st-century Austrian women